Club de Rugby Xerez Deportivo Fútbol Club (CRUXE DFC) is a rugby team based in the city of Jerez de la Frontera in Andalusia (Spain). It was founded in 1992 and refounded in 2009. The team plays in Pradera Hípica de Chapín next to Estadio Municipal de Chapín. There are many squads in his Rugby School for children. Currently, CRUXE DFC plays in Segunda Andaluza.

History
Cruxe was born in 1992 and it was refounded in 2009. In summer 2015, Xerez DFC and CRUXE get an agreement to collaborate by which both clubs belong at the same sport club.

The team started to play in Segunda Andaluza, holding his home matches at Pradera Hípica de Chapín. On 28 february, CRUXE was defeat in the play-offs to promote to 1ª División Andaluza after lose against Club de Nerja.

See also
Xerez Deportivo FC
Xerez DFC Fútbol Sala
Atletismo Chapín Xerez Deportivo FC

References

Spanish rugby union teams
Rugby clubs established in 1992
1992 establishments in Spain
Sport in Jerez de la Frontera
Sports teams in Andalusia